Theodoros Koutoumanis (born 20 March 1951) is a Greek former swimmer. He competed in the men's 100 metre breaststroke at the 1972 Summer Olympics.

References

1951 births
Living people
Greek male swimmers
Olympic swimmers of Greece
Swimmers at the 1972 Summer Olympics
Sportspeople from Istanbul
Constantinopolitan Greeks
Male breaststroke swimmers